"Lazy Days" is a song by English singer-songwriter Robbie Williams. It was released in the United Kingdom on 14 July 1997 as the second single from his debut studio album, Life thru a Lens (1997). According to Williams, the song is about being young, optimistic about the future and not afraid of committing mistakes. The song became a top-10 hit in the United Kingdom, peaking at number eight on the UK Singles Chart. A demo version of "Lazy Days" is included as a B-side on the "Millennium" CD2 single.

Critical reception
A reviewer from Music Week rated the song three out of five, adding, "Gary's former colleague continues to occupy indie-pop territory with a solid enough song. However, it lacks the killer chorus needed to better his previous chart performances." The magazine's Martin Aston described "Lazy Days" as "a hazy-lazy, summery feel, and an instant indication of Williams and [Guy] Chambers' Beatlesy tastes." David Sinclair from The Times viewed it as a "big, catchy, anthemic follow-up to Old Before I Die with fade-out borrowed from Hey Jude."

Music video
Williams took a day out of rehab to shoot the accompanying music video for the song, and he explained it was "a bonkers video, 'cause that's how my head was at the time, I think". Williams explained that "Lazy Days" was a song previously written by Guy Chambers, during his spell in the Britpop band the Lemon Trees. Williams thought it was an amazing song, but made some changes on the lyrics, including hooks in arrangement and music.

Track listings

 UK CD1 and cassette single
 "Lazy Days" – 3:53
 "Teenage Millionaire" – 3:09
 "Falling in Bed (Again)" – 3:28

 UK CD2
 "Lazy Days" – 3:53
 "She Makes Me High" – 3:23
 "Ev'ry Time We Say Goodbye" – 3:03

 European maxi-CD single
 "Lazy Days" – 3:53
 "She Makes Me High" – 3:23
 "Teenage Millionaire" – 3:09
 "Falling in Bed (Again)" – 3:28
 "Ev'ry Time We Say Goodbye" – 3:03

Credits and personnel
Credits are taken from the Life thru a Lens album booklet.

Studios
 Recorded at Matrix Maison Rouge (London, England)
 Mixed at Battery Studios (London, England)

Personnel

 Robbie Williams – writing, vocals, backing vocals
 Guy Chambers – writing, guitar, keyboards, production, arrangement
 Andre Barreau – backing vocals, guitar
 Steve McEwan – backing vocals, guitar
 Andy Caine – backing vocals
 Fil Eisler – bass
 Steve Power – keyboards, production, mixing
 Geoff Dugmore – drums
 Andy Duncan – percussion
 Jim Brumby – Battery Studios assistant
 Matt Hay – Matrix Maison Rouge assistant

Charts

References

1997 songs
1997 singles
Robbie Williams songs
Chrysalis Records singles
Song recordings produced by Guy Chambers
Song recordings produced by Steve Power
Songs written by Guy Chambers
Songs written by Robbie Williams